Volzhsky or Volzhskiy is an industrial town in Volgograd Oblast, Russia, located on the east bank of the Volga River and its distributary the Akhtuba,  northeast of Volgograd. Population:

History
There was no indigenous population on the site of the communist settlement of Volzhsky until the 18th century. The first settlers were fugitives who called themselves bezrodnye ("without kith or kin") and the village they set up had the name Bezrodnoye. In 1720, Peter the Great, noting the abundance of mulberry forests in the area, ordered building a state-run silk factory there.

Modern Volzhsky was founded in 1951. It had a population of about 10,000 at that time. In 1954, it was granted city status. Its biggest upsurge of population came for the construction of the Volga Hydroelectric Station.

Volzhsky grew around a hydroelectric power station which was built by Komsomol volunteers and by civil convict labor, who numbered almost 27,000 by 1953. Volzhsky was a city planned in a modern style with courtyard apartment blocks angled to deter hot summer winds off the steppes.

In April 2012, the work settlement of Krasnooktyabrsky, administratively subordinated to Volzhsky, and the rural locality (a settlement) of Uralsky from Sredneakhtubinsky District were merged into Volzhsky.

Administrative and municipal status
Within the framework of administrative divisions, it is incorporated as the city of oblast significance of Volzhsky—an administrative unit with the status equal to that of the districts. As a municipal division, the city of oblast significance of Volzhsky is incorporated as Volzhsky Urban Okrug.

Industry
The main enterprises in the city are Volga GES (a hydroelectric station), Volzhsky Trubny Zavod (producing steel pipes), Volzhsky Khimvolokno (chemical fibers), Volzhsky Orgsintez (chemical products), Volzhskrezinotekhnika (rubber products), Volzhsky Shinny Zavod (tires), Volzhsky Podshipnikovy Zavod (bearings), and JSC Zavod Meteor (electronic components).

Twin towns – sister cities

Volzhsky is twinned with:
 Cleveland Heights, United States
 Mönchengladbach, Nord-Rhein Westfalia, Deutschland
 Collegno, Italy
 Lianyungang, China

 Shaker Heights, United States

References

Sources

Cities and towns in Volgograd Oblast
Populated places on the Volga